Jason Binn (born 1968) is an American publisher and entrepreneur known for founding Niche Media and DuJour Media.

Biography 
Binn was born in 1968 to Moreton and Penny Binn in Roslyn, New York. He graduated from Boston University's College of Communications in 1986. He serves on the university's advisory board.

Binn married Haley Lieberman in December 2003. They have three children and resided together in New York City. before separating in 2016.

Publishing career
At 23, he began his publishing career at D'Arcy Masius Benton & Bowles. After graduating from Boston University, he built media brands across the country. Upon moving to South Florida, he founded Ocean Drive magazine in 1992, a luxury publication focusing on the Miami lifestyle.

In 1998, he founded Niche Media, a publisher of regional luxury magazines including Hamptons Magazine (The Hamptons, Long Island, New York), Aspen Peak (Aspen, Colorado), Boston Common (Boston, Mass), Capitol File (Washington, D.C.)., Gotham (New York), Los Angeles Confidential, Vegas Magazine  (Las Vegas) and Michigan Avenue (Chicago).

In 2010, Binn was appointed Chairman of Niche Media Holdings LLC. In the same 2010, Binn was the Chief Advisor to Gilt Groupe, an online luxury shopping company 

In 2012, Binn founded DuJour Media, his first major media launch since he sold Niche Media in 2006. DuJour's publications include Gotham Los Angeles, Aspen Peak and DuJour Magazine, the quarterly released chief publication, that caters to those who have a minimum net worth of $5 million.

Since 2016, he has been executive director of JetSmarter, Inc.

Awards and recognition
In 2005, Binn was profiled in Forbes magazine's "Forbes 400", and was awarded Ernst & Young's "Entrepreneur of the Year." In 2007, he was the only media member inducted into the American Advertising Federation's “Advertising Hall of Achievement”. In 2008, he was listed in Crain's “40 Under 40” list of successful entrepreneurs.

In fall 2012, Crain's New York credited Binn with making print magazines more successful in a time when print is losing market to digital media. He was also recognized by American Advertising Federation. In 2008 he was a recipient of Boston University's Distinguished Alumni Award for Service to Profession for his work in the field of communications and media.

References

1968 births
American magazine founders
American magazine publishers (people)
Businesspeople from New York (state)
Boston University College of Communication alumni
Living people
People from Roslyn, New York
20th-century American Jews
21st-century American Jews